Rod Laver won in the final of the Australian Indoor Tennis Championships singles event 3–6, 7–5, 6–3, 3–6, 6–4 against John Newcombe. Ken Rosewall won the play-off match for third place against Phil Dent in three sets, 4–6, 6–3, 6–0.

Draw

Section 1

Section 2

References

External links
 1973 Australian Indoor Championships draw

Singles